Peeter One is a 2013 Sri Lankan Sinhala comedy, family film directed by Bandu Samarasinghe and produced by Sisira Senaratne for Swarna Films. It stars Bandu Samarasinghe in lead role along with Veena Jayakody, Rodney Warnakula and Nilanthi Dias. Music for the film is done by Jayantha Rathnayake. The film became one of Sri Lanka's blockbuster movies with reaching more than 150 days in cinema theatres. It is the 1188th Sri Lankan film in the Sinhala cinema. This is the fourth film direction by Bandu Samarasinghe. His son Kanchana Samarasinghe and second daughter Rasoga Samarasinghe also introduced to the first time in cinema.

Cast
 Bandu Samarasinghe as Peeter
 Nilanthi Dias as Sherine
 Rodney Warnakula as Waiter Jonty
 Veena Jayakody as Elizabeth Briganza
 Lakshman Mendis as Lorenso Sylvester
 Manel Wanaguru as Dalryn, Bryan's mother
 Sarath Kulanga as Chief Chef
 Kanchana Samarasinghe as Bryan
 Susil Perera as Peeter's friend
 Rasoga Samarasinghe as Monika
 Sunil Perera in cameo appearance

Soundtrack

Production
The shooting work began on August 5, 2012 and the shooting was completed on November 1, 2012. Permission for the film was obtained from the Board of Directors on December 18. The media briefing was held on December 20, 2012. The film was screened on May 10, 2013. The film successfully screened in E.A.P circuit cinemas from its distribution date in Colombo.

References

2013 films
2010s Sinhala-language films
2013 comedy films
Sri Lankan comedy films